A picture cover is a type of book cover which uses a method of bookbinding that preserves the contents as well as a normal hardbound book, but has the look of a paperback book. The pages are collated, stitched and trimmed as for hardbound, but a cover with a picture on it is attached instead of the normal hardbound cover with printing on the spine, and perhaps also the front. A hardbound book can achieve a similar look with a dust cover, but the cover is fragile and inconvenient when reading, being most useful while the book is shelved.

The term "picture cover" is mostly used by book collectors. Many early series books and later children's books have this binding, as do most modern textbooks.

Book design